Maiopatagium is an extinct genus of gliding euharamiyids which existed in Asia during the Jurassic period. It possessed a patagium between its limbs and presumably had similar lifestyle to living flying squirrels and colugos. The type species is Maiopatagium furculiferum, which was described from the Tiaojishan Formation by Zhe-Xi Luo in 2017; it lived in what is now the Liaoning region of China during the late Jurassic (Oxfordian age).Maiopatagium and Vilevolodon, described concurrently, offer clues to the ways various synapsids have taken to the skies over evolutionary time scales. A second species, M. sibiricum, was described from the Bathonian aged Itat Formation in western Siberia, Russia in 2019

References 

Euharamiyids
Prehistoric cynodont genera
Bathonian life
Callovian life
Oxfordian life
Middle Jurassic synapsids of Asia
Late Jurassic synapsids of Asia
Jurassic China
Fossils of China
Paleontology in Liaoning
Fossil taxa described in 2017
Taxa named by Zhe-Xi Luo
Taxa named by Qing-Jin Meng
Taxa named by David M. Grossnickle
Taxa named by Di Liu
Taxa named by April I. Neander
Taxa named by Yu-Guang Zhang
Taxa named by Qiang Ji (paleontologist)